Oksana Andrusina-Mert, née Oksana Andrusina (born March 26, 1973), aka Oksana Mert or formerly Aksel Mert, is a Turkish female discus thrower of Russian origin.

She became Turkish citizen by marriage on July 27, 1998 and adopted the Turkish name Aksel Mert. She competed for Fenerbahçe Athletics team.

She is the holder of national record in discus throw set on May 30, 1999 in Krasnodar, Russia. She participated at the 2000 Summer Olympics in Sydney, Australia without success.

Achievements
 57.31 m – 1999 World Championships in Athletics, Sevilla, Spain 23 August 1999 – 13th
 55.02 m – 2000 Summer Olympics-Qualification round B, Sydney, Australia 25 September 2000

Personal best
 64.25 m NR Krasnodar 1999

References

External links
 

1973 births
Living people
Russian emigrants to Turkey
Turkish people of Russian descent
Turkish female discus throwers
Fenerbahçe athletes
Olympic athletes of Turkey
Athletes (track and field) at the 2000 Summer Olympics
Naturalized citizens of Turkey